The Robert Ranulph Marett Memorial Lectureship at Exeter College, Oxford is a memorial lecture established in memory of R. R. Marett, D.Litt., D.Sc., F.B.A., Rector of the College 1928-43, by subscribers to a Memorial Fund.

List of Marett Lectures

Notes
Except where otherwise indicated, dates and titles are from the Oxford University Gazette.

References

Lecture series at the University of Oxford
Anthropology
Exeter College, Oxford
Culture of the University of Oxford